Ratchaburi railway station is a railway station in Na Mueang Subdistrict, Ratchaburi Province,  from Thon Buri railway station. It is a class 1 railway station. It opened in 1903 along with the opening of the first phase of the Southern Line from Thon Buri railway station to Phetchaburi railway station. In the past it was a water and wood refueling station for steam locomotives and a terminus for some services, therefore a water tank, water cranes and a turntable remain as monuments to the station's past.

Train services 

 Thaksinarath Express 31/32 Krung Thep Aphiwat - Hat Yai Junction - Krung Thep Aphiwat
 Thaksin Express 37/38 Krung Thep Aphiwat - Sungai Kolok - Krung Thep Aphiwat
 Special Express 39/40 Krung Thep Aphiwat - Surat Thani - Krung Thep Aphiwat
 Special Express 41/42 Krung Thep Aphiwat - Yala - Krung Thep Aphiwat (suspended due to COVID-19 pandemic)
 Special Express 43/44 Krung Thep Aphiwat - Surat Thani - Krung Thep Aphiwat
 International Express 45/46 Krung Thep Aphiwat - Padang Besar - Krung Thep Aphiwat
 Express 83/84 Krung Thep Aphiwat - Trang - Krung Thep Aphiwat
 Express 85/86 Krung Thep Aphiwat - Nakhon Si Thammarat - Krung Thep Aphiwat
 Rapid 167/168 Krung Thep Aphiwat - Kantang - Krung Thep Aphiwat
 Rapid 169/170 Krung Thep Aphiwat - Yala - Krung Thep Aphiwat
 Rapid 171/172 Krung Thep Aphiwat - Sungai Kolok - Krung Thep Aphiwat
 Rapid 173/174 Krung Thep Aphiwat - Nakhon Si Thammarat - Krung Thep Aphiwat (suspended due to COVID-19 pandemic)
 Ordinary 261/262 Bangkok (Hua Lamphong) - Hua Hin - Bangkok (Hua Lamphong)
 Ordinary 251/252 Thon Buri - Prachuap Khiri Khan - Thon Buri
 Ordinary 254/255 Lang Suan - Thon Buri - Lang Suan

 Ordinary 351/352 Thon Buri - Ratchaburi - Thon Buri

References 
 
 
 
 
 

Railway stations in Thailand
Railway stations opened in 1903